Alfred E. Saggese Jr. (born November 21, 1946) is an American politician who served in the Massachusetts House of Representatives 1975 to 1991.

References

1946 births
Living people
Democratic Party members of the Massachusetts House of Representatives